The Hilbert Museum of California Art is a U.S. museum located at Chapman University in Orange, California. The museum's collection consists of more than 1,000 paintings – primarily watercolors and oil paintings by artists of the California Scene Painting movement.

History 
The Hilbert Museum of California Art, located in the historic district of Old Town Orange, opened in 2016. It was founded by Mark and Janet Hilbert with a gift of $10 million, including a collection of more than 1,000 paintings valued at more than $7 million in 2015. The collection consists mostly of works in oil and watercolor created between the 1930s and the 1970s by artists – including Millard Sheets, Emil Kosa Jr., Phil Dike, Milford Zornes and Rex Brandt – of the California Scene Painting movement, a form of American regionalist art depicting scenes of everyday life involving landscapes, places, and people of California. The museum also features regular exhibitions of works of American illustrators, as well as the motion-picture production art and animation art created by many of the California Scene artists, who found work in the movie studios during the Great Depression.

Expansion 
With the support of the founders, Chapman University is planning a major expansion of the museum, with groundbreaking tentatively scheduled for late 2021 to early 2022 and doors opening between 2022 and 2023. The current 7,500-square-foot facility will triple in size, being extended to between 21,000 and 28,500 square feet. The price of the expansion will be around $14 million, and the goal is to have 100,000 visitors per year by 2025.

References 

2015 establishments in California
Chapman University
Art museums and galleries in California